Alfonso Bravo de Laguna, O.F.M. (1616 – 9 June 1674) was a Roman Catholic prelate who served as Bishop of Nicaragua (1664–1674).

Biography
Alfonso Bravo de Laguna was born in Tepeaca, México in 1616 and ordained a priest in the Order of Friars Minor.
After the death of Tomás Manso in 1659, he was appointed in 1660 as Vicar Capitular of the Diocese of León in Nicaragua. As Manso's replacement, Bishop Juan de la Torre y Castro, died six days after arriving in Nicaragua, he continued as administrator of the diocese. In July 1664, he was selected by the King of Spain as Bishop of Nicaragua but not confirmed by Pope Clement X until six years later on 1 September 1670. On 21 September 1671, he was consecrated bishop by Juan de Sancto Mathía Sáenz de Mañozca y Murillo, Bishop of Santiago de Guatemala. He served as Bishop of Nicaragua until his death on 9 June 1674 in Cartago, Costa Rica.

References

External links and additional sources
 (for Chronology of Bishops) 
 (for Chronology of Bishops) 

17th-century Roman Catholic bishops in Nicaragua
Bishops appointed by Pope Clement X
1616 births
1674 deaths
Franciscan bishops
Roman Catholic bishops of León in Nicaragua